The men's high jump event at the 1975 European Athletics Indoor Championships was held on 8 March in Katowice.

Results

References

High jump at the European Athletics Indoor Championships
High